The 2021–22 season was the 34th season in the existence of K.R.C. Genk and the club's 27th consecutive season in the top flight of Belgian football. In addition to the domestic league, Genk participated in this season's editions of the Belgian Cup, the Belgian Super Cup where it finished as runners-up, the UEFA Champions League where it got eliminated in the third qualifying round and in the UEFA Europa League.

Players

First-team squad

Other players under contract

Out on loan

Transfers

Pre-season and friendlies

Competitions

Overall record

First Division A

League table

Results summary

Results by round

Matches
The league fixtures were announced on 8 June 2021.

Play-Off II

Results summary

Results by round

Matches

Belgian Cup

Belgian Super Cup

UEFA Champions League

Third qualifying round

UEFA Europa League

Group stage

The draw for the group stage was held on 27 August 2021.

Statistics

Squad appearances and goals
Last updated on 21 May 2022.

|-
! colspan=16 style=background:#dcdcdc; text-align:center|Goalkeepers

|-
! colspan=16 style=background:#dcdcdc; text-align:center|Defenders

|-
! colspan=16 style=background:#dcdcdc; text-align:center|Midfielders

|-
! colspan=16 style=background:#dcdcdc; text-align:center|Forwards

|-
! colspan=16 style=background:#dcdcdc; text-align:center|Players who have made an appearance this season but have left the club

|}

Goalscorers

References

K.R.C. Genk seasons
Genk